Andre Agassi defeated Goran Ivanišević in the final, 6–7(8–10), 6–4, 6–4, 1–6, 6–4 to win the gentlemen's singles tennis title at the 1992 Wimbledon Championships. It was Agassi's first major title and his first leg of an eventual career Grand Slam. Ivanisević became the first Croatian representing Croatia to reach a major final.

Michael Stich was the defending champion, but lost in the quarterfinals to Pete Sampras.

Jim Courier was attempting to become the first man to achieve the Surface Slam (winning major titles on hard court, clay and grass in the same calendar year) after winning the Australian Open and French Open earlier in the year; he also attempted to win the Australian Open, French Open and Wimbledon in the same calendar year for the first time since Rod Laver in 1969. He lost to Andrei Olhovskiy in the third round.

This was the last Wimbledon at which three-time champion John McEnroe and two-time champion Jimmy Connors competed.

This was the last tennis tournament in which Ivan Lendl represented Czechoslovakia. He gained citizenship of the United States on 7 July 1992, and from that point on represented the USA for the remainder of his tennis career.

Seeds

  Jim Courier (third round)
  Stefan Edberg (quarterfinals)
  Michael Stich (quarterfinals)
  Boris Becker (quarterfinals)
  Pete Sampras (semifinals)
  Petr Korda (second round)
  Michael Chang (first round)
  Goran Ivanišević (final)

  Guy Forget (quarterfinals)
  Ivan Lendl (fourth round)
  Richard Krajicek (third round)
  Andre Agassi (champion)
  Brad Gilbert (third round)
  Wayne Ferreira (fourth round)
  Alexander Volkov (third round)
  David Wheaton (third round)

Qualifying

Draw

Finals

Top half

Section 1

Section 2

Section 3

Section 4

Bottom half

Section 5

Section 6

Section 7

Section 8

Notes

References

External links

 1992 Wimbledon Championships – Men's draws and results at the International Tennis Federation

Men's Singles
Wimbledon Championship by year – Men's singles